Blood of Empire is the third book in the flintlock fantasy trilogy Gods of Blood and Powder written by American author Brian McClellan. It was published by Orbit Books on December 3, 2019. It is the sequel to Sins of Empire and Wrath of Empire.

Plot
Michel Bravis, a spy in the Dynize government, must go back to the capital city of Landfall to prevent the enemy of using the power of the unlocked Godstone.

Ben Styke has invaded Dynize, but his fleet scattered in a storm and he is left with only twenty Mad Lancers. Violence is unavoidable.

Her last battle against the Dynize has left Lady Vlora Flint powderblind and emotionally broken, but vengeance keeps her on her feet. She must ally politicians and lead the Adran army to defeat the greatest general under the Dynize flag.

See also 
 Promise of Blood, the first book in The Powder Mage trilogy
 The Crimson Campaign, the sequel to Promise of Blood
 The Autumn Republic, the sequel to The Crimson Campaign
 Sins of Empire, the first book in the Gods of Blood and Powder trilogy
 Wrath of Empire, the second book in the Gods of Blood and Powder trilogy
 Brian McClellan, the author of The Powder Mage trilogy

References

External links 
 Official website of Brian McClellan

2019 fantasy novels
2019 American novels
American fantasy novels
Orbit Books books